Meshuggah is a Swedish extreme metal band formed in 1987 in Umeå. Meshuggah is known for its use of extended polymetric passages, complex time signatures, dissonant guitar riffs, and harsh vocals. As of 2008, the band consists of vocalist Jens Kidman, guitarists Fredrik Thordendal and Mårten Hagström, bassist Dick Lövgren and drummer Tomas Haake.

Meshuggah's first release was a self-titled three-song 12" vinyl EP, Meshuggah, which is commonly known as Psykisk Testbild, although that title is not printed anywhere. Only 1000 copies were released by local record store Garageland in Umeå. After signing to German heavy metal record label Nuclear Blast, Meshuggah released its debut album Contradictions Collapse in 1991. Meshuggah's second album, Destroy Erase Improve, was released in 1995.

Thordendal's side project's album, Sol Niger Within, was released in 1997, as was the next Meshuggah EP, The True Human Design. These were followed by the next full-length album, Chaosphere, in 1998.

A collection of demos (from Meshuggah) and rare recordings were released as the Rare Trax album in 2001. In 2002 the band released their next album, Nothing. Meshuggah was not satisfied with the production of the album and later re-recorded the guitars for the re-release in 2006, which also includes a bonus DVD that features the band's appearance at the Download 2005 festival, along with the official music videos for "Rational Gaze", "Shed" and "New Millennium Cyanide Christ". Meshuggah released I in 2004, a single 21-minute track, and in 2005 the band released the next full-length album, Catch Thirtythree, a 47-minute song divided up into 13 movements, the only album with programmed drums. In 2008, Meshuggah released obZen, followed by Koloss in 2012 and The Violent Sleep of Reason in 2016.

Studio albums

Live albums

Compilation albums

EPs

Music videos

References

External links 
 

Meshuggah
Meshuggah
Discographies of Swedish artists